Cairo American College (or CAC) is a Pre-K–12 International American School located in Maadi, Cairo, Egypt. It caters mainly to dependents of the local American embassy and other international students. Cairo American College is a not for-profit school.

Curriculum
CAC follows "American Education Reaches Out" (AERO) standards. International Baccalaureate and Advanced Placement programs are offered within the high school, giving students the option to opt-in or out, to suit individual educational needs. Starting in the eleventh grade students may elect to pursue an International Baccalaureate Diploma.

Cairo American College is accredited by the Middle States Association of Colleges and Schools and Council of International Schools. Cairo American College holds membership with Association for the Advancement of International Education (AAIE) and Near East South Asia Council of Overseas Schools (NESA).

Students

The United States Department of State provides direct and indirect support to CAC. However, CAC is not a Department of Defense (DOD) school. Despite this, a significant portion of dependents of the American Embassy attend CAC. As of the 2021-2022 school year, enrollment is 830 (Pre-K.-grade 5: 349; grades 6-8: 180; and grades 9-12: 304). Of the total, 300 are U.S. citizens, 188 are host-country nationals, and 345 are of other nationalities. Of the U.S. enrollment, 123 are dependents of U.S. Government direct-hire or contract employees, and 177 of either U.S. business and foundation employees or other private U.S. citizens. Ninety-eight percent of the school's graduates go on to colleges and universities in the United States or other countries.

Notable alumni
 Farida Osman, Olympic swimmer
 Yousef Al Otaiba, United Arab Emirates ambassador to the United States
 Steve Kerr, NBA coach and former player
 Colson Baker, Machine Gun Kelly, American Rapper

References

International schools in Greater Cairo
Schools in Cairo
International schools in Egypt
International Baccalaureate schools in Egypt
American international schools in Egypt
Private schools in Cairo
1945 establishments in Egypt
Educational institutions established in 1945